King Tom (1851–1878) was a British Thoroughbred racehorse and a leading sire in Great Britain & Ireland.

Pedigree
He was a bay horse foaled in 1851, sired by Harkaway and out of the exceptional mare Pocahontas by Glencoe. King Tom was a half-brother to 14 of Pocahontas' foals including, Auricula (a stakes winner), plus Stockwell and his brother, Rataplan, both being by The Baron.

Racing record
King Tom won races at age two and at age three he was not quite recovered from an injury when he finished second by a length to Andover in the 1854 Epsom Derby. He came out of the Derby with a tendon injury that curtailed his racing for the remainder of the year. At age four, King Tom returned to the track and won one race before breaking down.

Stud record
Retired to stud duty, King Tom became the foundation stallion for Baron Mayer de Rothschild's Mentmore and Crafton Studs. Between 1861 and 1877 he was one of the United Kingdom's top ten sires 14 times and the Leading sire in Great Britain & Ireland in 1870 and 1871. King Tom sired the 1866 and 1867 Epsom Oaks winners, Tormentor and Hippia, as well as the 1870 Epsom Derby winner Kingcraft. He also sired 1864 1,000 Guineas Stakes winner Tomato plus another outstanding filly Hannah who in 1871 won the Epsom Oaks, 1,000 Guineas and St. Leger Stakes. One of his most important foals was his daughter, St. Angela, dam of St. Simon and second dam of Orme.

King Tom is the damsire of Favonius, winner of the 1871 Epsom Derby and the grandsire of the Irish Derby winner Umpire plus the grandsire of United States Racing Hall of Fame inductee, Ten Broeck.

King Tom died at age twenty-seven in January 1878. He was buried in the grounds of Mentmore Towers beneath a life sized bronze statue by Sir Joseph Boehm. The statue is now at Dalmeny House in Scotland.

Pedigree

References

External links
Bloodlines

1851 racehorse births
1878 racehorse deaths
British Champion Thoroughbred Sires
Racehorses bred in the United Kingdom
Racehorses trained in the United Kingdom
Thoroughbred family 3-m